Blue Hill Avenue is a 2001 American crime drama film directed and written by Craig Ross Jr., and starring Allen Payne. Ross also edited and executive produced the film.

Synopsis
Tristan (the leader), Simon (the right-hand man), E-Bone (the hot head) and Money (the mediator) are four smart friends growing up in the tough Roxbury section of Boston in the 1980s. Starting out as small-time dope dealers on Blue Hill Avenue in Roxbury, they eventually go to work for Benny, a major player in the Boston crime scene.

As the four friends grow up and become the biggest dealers in the city, things become increasingly heated: Tristan's wife wants him to leave the business because she's pregnant, Tristan finds out his sister is hooked on drugs and is alienated from his family, Simon becomes obsessed with a near-death experience and expects to die, cops dog their tracks trying every trick in and out of the book to catch them. Benny, their main supplier, wants them out of the business for good.

Worse, it becomes clear one of the four is trying to sell the others out to the cops. In the end, Tristan faces Benny down alone.  Will he be able to get out of the business—and the life—for good?

Cast
Allen Payne as Tristan
W.B. Alexander as young Tristan
Angelle Brooks as Martine
Diane Fauteux as young Martine
Michael "Bear" Taliferro as Simon
Dana Blair as young Simon
William L. Johnson as "E-Bone"
Brandon Hammond as young E-Bone
Aaron D. Spears as "Money"
Percy Daggs III as young Money
Andrew Divoff as Detective Tyler
Richard Lawson as Uncle Rob
Marlon Young as "Twinkie"
Clarence Williams III as Benny
William Forsythe as Detective Torrance
William Butler as "Big Time"
Chris Thornton as Lathan
William Springfield as "Soul Train"
Pooch Hall (credited as Marion Hall) as Billy "Schlep Rock" Brown
Kenny Robinson as Sam
Emily Bruhier as Martine's girlfriend

Awards & nominations
2001 Acapulco Black Film Festival
Best U.S. Film – Blue Hill Avenue, Craig Ross Jr. (winner)

2002 Black Reel Awards
Best Independent Actor (Theatrical) – Allen Payne (winner)
Best Independent Film (Theatrical) – (nominated)

2001 Urbanworld Film Festival
Best Director – Craig Ross Jr. (winner)

See also 
 List of hood films

References

External links

2001 films
2000s crime drama films
American crime drama films
Artisan Entertainment films
Films set in Boston
Lionsgate films
Hood films
2000s English-language films
2000s American films